Cruise Mode is an Australian motoring magazine television series which screened on Network Ten from 23 July 2016 at 3pm Saturdays. It is hosted by Shannon Noll and Charli Robinson and is about special cars, special places and special road trips.

From the beach to bush a classic car and classic destination Cruise Mode is a relaxed way to explore all that great motoring has to offer

Network 10 original programming
Automotive television series
2016 Australian television series debuts
2017 Australian television series endings